Calcium chromate is an inorganic compound with the formula CaCrO4, i.e. the chromate salt of calcium. It is a bright yellow solid which is normally found in the dihydrate form CaCrO4·2H2O. A very rare anhydrous mineral form exists in nature, which is known as chromatite.

The compound is occasionally used as a pigment, but this usage is limited due to the very toxic and carcinogenic nature of hexavalent chromium compounds such as chromate salts.

Synthesis and reactions
Calcium chromate is formed from the salt metathesis reaction of sodium chromate and calcium chloride:
Na2CrO4 + CaCl2 → CaCrO4 + 2 NaCl

In aqueous solution the dihydrate is obtained, which loses water to afford the anhydrate at 200 °C.

It is an oxidiser, oxidising organic compounds (e.g. alcohols) or reducing agents (e.g. metals) to the corresponding carbonyl compounds or metal oxides while the chromium(VI) centre in CaCrO4 is reduced to chromium(III).

Solid calcium chromate will react explosively with hydrazine. It will also burn violently if mixed with boron and ignited, thereby posing a fire hazard.

Uses
The compound is occasionally used as a yellow inorganic pigment, or a corrosion inhibitor as part of the chromate conversion coating procedure.

It has been also utilised in chromium electroplating, in photochemical processing, and as an industrial waste treatment.

All applications suffer from the high toxicity of chromium(VI) species to humans, with chromates listed as IARC Group 1 carcinogens while also very corrosive (e.g. capable of producing permanent eye damage) and genotoxic.

References

Chromates
Calcium compounds
Inorganic pigments